James Fletcher may refer to:

Politicians
James Fletcher (English politician), MP for Cambridge
 James Fletcher (Australian politician) (1834–1891), Australian coalminer and owner, newspaper proprietor and politician
 James H. Fletcher (1835–1917), Lieutenant Governor of South Dakota

Other
 James Cooley Fletcher (1823–1901), American Presbyterian minister and missionary
 James Fletcher (entomologist) (1852–1908), Canadian entomologist, botanist and writer
 J. M. J. Fletcher (1852–1934), English historian
 James Fletcher (industrialist) (1886–1974), New Zealand businessman and industrialist
 James Fletcher Jnr (1914–2007), his son, New Zealand businessman and industrialist
 James C. Fletcher (1919–1991), NASA administrator
 James Fletcher (footballer) (1926–2014), English footballer active in the 1950s

See also
 Jamie "Fletch" Fletcher, character in the soap opera  Hollyoaks
 Jaime Fletcher, founder of IslamInSpanish
 Jim Fletcher, fictional character in Prisoner
 James Fletcher Epes, U.S. representative from Virginia